Nehzatabad (also Romanized as Nehz̤atābād; also known as Nehz̤atābād-e Manūjān) is a village in Qaleh Rural District, in the Central District of Manujan County, Kerman Province, Iran. At the 2006 census, its population was 447, in 89 families.

References 

Populated places in Manujan County